Dudley Goodall Wooten (June 19, 1860 – February 7, 1929) was a U.S. Representative from Texas.

Early years

Born near Springfield, Missouri, Wooten moved in infancy with his parents to Texas during the Civil War.

Education

He attended private schools in Paris, Texas, and graduated from Princeton University in 1875.
He attended Johns Hopkins University, Baltimore, Maryland, and graduated from the law department of the University of Virginia at Charlottesville, where he won the school's highest awards for writing and debate and was a member of Phi Kappa Psi Fraternity.

Career

He was admitted to the bar in 1880 and practiced in Austin, Texas.
He served as prosecuting attorney of Austin 1884–1886.
He moved to Dallas, Texas, in 1888.
He served as judge of the Dallas County district court 1890–1892.
He served as member of the State house of representatives in 1898 and 1899.
As a member of the Texas legislature, Wooten served as delegate to the National Antitrust Conference at Chicago in 1899.
He served as member of the executive council of the National Civic Federation in 1900.
He served as delegate to the National Tax Conference at Buffalo in 1901.  Congressman Wooten traveled to Alaska  in 1902  to make a Congressional study of the needs of the territory.

Wooten was elected as a Democrat to the Fifty-seventh Congress to fill the vacancy caused by the death of Robert Emmet Burke and served from July 13, 1901, to March 3, 1903.  In 1902 Wooten lost in his attempt to be nominated as the Democratic candidate for the house seat.

Later years

After leaving the house, Wooten resumed his law practice in Seattle, Washington.
He served as special judge of the superior court at various times.
He served as delegate to the National Rivers and Harbors Congress in 1912.
He served as delegate to the National Conservation Congress in 1913.
He was appointed a member of the State board of higher curricula by the Governor in 1919.

Wooten worked as a professor of law at the University of Notre Dame, Notre Dame, Indiana from 1924 to 1928.  He died, while on a visit, in Austin, Texas, on February 7, 1929.
He was interred in Calvary Cemetery, Seattle, Washington,   next to his first wife Ellen Carter Wooten.

Fraternal memberships

Phi Kappa Psi

Bibliography

References

Sources

External links
 

1860 births
1929 deaths
Princeton University alumni
Johns Hopkins University alumni
University of Virginia School of Law alumni
University of Notre Dame faculty
Notre Dame Law School faculty
Democratic Party members of the United States House of Representatives from Texas
19th-century American lawyers
Texas State Historical Association presidents
Texas State Historical Association charter members